Fox Tales is a 1976 anthology of 16 animal-centered fairy tales from around the world that have been collected and retold by Ruth Manning-Sanders. These tales are written for a slightly younger level of reader than Manning-Sanders' more familiar "A Book of..." series of fairy tales.

Contents
1. Terry Gong-Gong (Africa)
2. What did you do? (Africa)
3. The fish cart (Finland)
4. The well (Finland)
5. Fox the gooseherd (Estonia)
6. Fox and Crocodile (India)
7. Lucky or unlucky? (India)
8. Fox and Weasel (East Africa)
9. Fox and Hare (Nova Scotia)
10. The little cake (Caucasus)
11. In the wolf pit (Hungary)
12. Fox and Crow (Egypt)
13. Umbrella (Russia)
14. Buns and honey (Turkey)
15. Over the wall (Turkey)
16. The very little man (Germany)

1976 children's books
1976 short story collections
Children's short story collections
Collections of fairy tales
Literature featuring anthropomorphic foxes
Books about foxes
Methuen Publishing books
1976 anthologies